Podlesina  (Pidlisyna) is a village in the administrative district of Gmina Narol, within Lubaczów County, Subcarpathian Voivodeship, in south-eastern Poland.

The village has a population of 180.

References

Podlesina